The writing-riddle is an international riddle type, attested across Europe and Asia. Its most basic form was defined by Antti Aarne as 'white field, black seeds', where the field is a page and the seeds are letters. However, this form admits of variations very diverse in length and degree of detail. For example, a version from Astrakhan translates as "the enclosure is white, the sheep are black", while one from the Don Kalmyks appears as "a black dog runs on white snow", and literary riddlers especially have produced long variations on the theme, often overlapping with riddles on pens and other writing equipment.

Significance

Literary riddles have been particularly prized by scholars for the insights they give into how past writers have conceptualised the act of writing.

Anglo-Saxon examples

One of the Old English riddles of the Exeter book is a variations on the writing-riddle: Exeter Book Riddle 51. Earlier and more frequent examples appear among Anglo-Latin riddles, however, as follows.

Aldhelm, c. C7, ‘De pugullarbius’ (‘on wax tablets’)

Aldhelm (c. C6), ‘De penna scriptoris’ (‘On the writer’s quill’)

Tatwine (C8), Enigma 5, 'De membrano' ('on parchment')

Romance examples

The writing riddle was very popular in the Romance languages, and indeed arguably the first attestation of a language written in Romance rather than Latin is the eighth- or ninth-century Veronese Riddle:

Here, the oxen are the scribe's finger(s) and thumb, and the plough is the pen. Among literary riddles, riddles on the pen and other writing equipment are particularly widespread.

This French version is attested in a fifteenth-century manuscript:

And these versions are attested in the French creole of Mauritius:

Pen riddles

Pen riddles are to a greater or lesser extent allied to the traditional writing riddle. Examples of pure pen-riddles include the Old English Exeter Book Riddle 60, two by the tenth-century Hebrew-language poet Dunash ben Labrat, and others follow.

Palatine Anthology (Greek)
I was a reed, a useless plant; for from me is born neither fig nor apple nor grape; but a man initiated me into the ways of Helicon, having shaped fine edges and having carved out a narrow channel. From then, should I drink black liquid, as if inspired, with this dumb mouth I utter every kind of word.

Symphosius (c. C4) 'Harundo' ('reed') (Latin)

This poem adverts to the use of reeds for making pipes as well as pens.

Al-Harīrī of Basra (1054–1122) ('reed-pen') (Arabic)

One split in his head it is, through whom ‘the writ’ is known, as honoured recording angels take their pride in him;
When given a drink he craves for more, as though athirst, and settles to rest when thirstiness takes hold of him;
And scatters tears about him when he bids him run, but tears that sparkle with the brightness of a smile.

Al-Ibshīhī (1388-1448) ('pen') (Arabic)

Judah Halevi (Hebrew)

What's slender, smooth and fine,
and speaks with power while dumb,
in utter silence kills,
and spews the blood of lambs?

References

Riddles